Synanthedon nyanga is a moth of the family Sesiidae. It is known from Gabon.

References

Endemic fauna of Gabon
Sesiidae
Fauna of Gabon
Moths of Africa
Moths described in 1899